Seo Gang-uk (born 26 March 1929) is a South Korean former sports shooter. He competed in the 50 metre pistol event at the 1964 Summer Olympics.

References

External links
  

1929 births
Possibly living people
South Korean male sport shooters
Olympic shooters of South Korea
Shooters at the 1964 Summer Olympics
Sportspeople from South Gyeongsang Province
South Korean military personnel
Asian Games medalists in shooting
Shooters at the 1962 Asian Games
Shooters at the 1966 Asian Games
Shooters at the 1970 Asian Games
Asian Games gold medalists for South Korea
Asian Games silver medalists for South Korea
Asian Games bronze medalists for South Korea
Medalists at the 1962 Asian Games
Medalists at the 1966 Asian Games
Medalists at the 1970 Asian Games
20th-century South Korean people
21st-century South Korean people